State Route 647 (SR 647) is a state highway in eastern Ohio connecting the city of Martins Ferry with the village of Mount Pleasant.  in length, its southern terminus is at SR 7 and its northern terminus is at SR 150.

Route description
SR 647 begins at a signalized intersection with the four-lane divided SR 7 in the city of Martins Ferry, near the Ohio River. Hanover Street continues southeast across a railroad towards the industrial sections of the city. SR 647 and Hanover Street head northwest into downtown Martins Ferry. The state highway briefly follows North 6th Street for about two blocks before turning left onto Carlisle Street. The route slowly climbs in elevation through the developed part of the city but as it exits the downtown residential neighborhood, the route heads up the side of a hill at a steeper slope and includes some hairpin turns. As it exits the city limits, SR 647 heads through hilly terrain and occasionally passes homes as it travels northwest. Upon entering the community of Morningview, the route turns north and then east briefly as it winds its way into a valley. After passing County Road 2 (former Ohio State Route 798), it turns north again and exits Belmont County for Jefferson County. This part of the route ascends in a narrow valley towards Mount Pleasant. At the top of the hill, the route curves west and enters the village limits on Union Street. After traveling  through Mount Pleasant, the highway ends at the intersection of Union and Concord Streets; this intersection has SR 150 entering from the west and exiting to the north.

History
The route was first designated a state highway in 1939 on the same alignment as it runs today. All of the road was gravel-paved at the time of its inclusion to the state highway system. By 1950, the entire route was asphalt-paved.

Major intersections

References

647
Transportation in Belmont County, Ohio
Transportation in Jefferson County, Ohio